Thomas Hall Wallace (1 July 1906 – 1939) was an English professional association footballer who played as a central defender. He made 61 appearances and scored one goal in the Football League Second Division for Burnley.

References

1906 births
1939 deaths
Sportspeople from Jarrow
Footballers from Tyne and Wear
English footballers
Association football defenders
Sunderland A.F.C. players
Burnley F.C. players
English Football League players